Graham Diggle (13 March 1889 – 31 May 1971) was an Australian rules footballer who played with Collingwood in the Victorian Football League (VFL).

Family
The son of George Diggle (1860-1938), an undertaker, and Lucy Diggle (1870-1946), née Bird, Graham Diggle was born at Flemington, Victoria on 13 March 1889.

He married Agnes Mary Smith (1886-1959) on 11 April 1914.

Football

Collingwood VFL)
Recruited from the Euroa Football Club in the Euroa District Football League (EDFL), he played 13 games for Collingwood's First XVIII over three seasons: 9 games in 1907; 2 games in 1908; and 2 games in 1909.

Euroa (EDFL)
Released by Collingwood in May 1909, he returned to the Euroa Football Club.

Essendon A (VFA)
Cleared from Collingwood to Essendon A in the VFA in July 1912, Diggle played in 44 First XVIII matches for Essendon from 1912 to 1915, and 3 games in the post-war VFA competition in 1919.

Seymour (WNEFA)
From 1920 to 1924, he was captain-coach of the Seymour Football Club in the Waranga North East Football Association. The team won two premierships in Diggle's time as coach: in 1920, and in 1923 (unbeaten in the entire season).

Death
He died at Seymour, Victoria on 31 May 1971.

Notes

References

External links 

 
 
 Graham Diggle at The VFA Project.
 Graham Diggle's profile at Collingwood Forever

1889 births
1971 deaths
Euroa Football Club players
Collingwood Football Club players
Essendon Association Football Club players
Australian rules footballers from Melbourne
People from Flemington, Victoria
Funeral directors
Australian rules football coaches